Iva Slišković (born September 4, 1984) is a Croatian female basketball player. At the 2012 Summer Olympics, she competed for the Croatia women's national basketball team in the women's event.

South Carolina statistics
Source

References

1984 births
Living people
Basketball players from Zagreb
Croatian women's basketball players
Centers (basketball)
Olympic basketball players of Croatia
Basketball players at the 2012 Summer Olympics
South Carolina Gamecocks women's basketball players
Mediterranean Games bronze medalists for Croatia
Competitors at the 2009 Mediterranean Games
Mediterranean Games medalists in basketball